Li Changxiang (born 2 July 1971) is a Chinese short track speed skater. She competed in the women's 3000 metre relay event at the 1992 Winter Olympics.

References

1971 births
Living people
Chinese female short track speed skaters
Olympic short track speed skaters of China
Short track speed skaters at the 1992 Winter Olympics
Place of birth missing (living people)
20th-century Chinese women